Federico Bianchi (born May 23, 1983, in Pacific Palisades, California) is a former American professional soccer player. He is of Italian ancestry.

Career

College
Bianchi attended Pacific Palisades High School, before playing college soccer at Boston University, where he was named MVP for the American East Tournament as a senior in 2004.

Professional
After spending time playing in the MLS Reserve Division with Los Angeles Galaxy's reserves in 2005, Bianchi signed to play with the Long Island Rough Riders in the USL Second Division in 2006.

Bianchi joined the expansion California Victory in the USL First Division prior to their debut season in 2007, and played in 11 games for the team, scoring 2 goals, before the team folded at the end of the season.

Bianchi was unable to secure a professional contract following Victory's demise, and returned to southern California. After playing for a year in men's amateur leagues in the Los Angeles area, including for Hollywood United in a celebrity charity game against Los Angeles Galaxy, Bianchi signed with the expansion Hollywood United Hitmen in the USL Premier Development League in 2009, and played 12 games for the team in their debut PDL season.

Coaching
Bianchi is currently the head coach of Los Angeles Blues 23 in the USL Premier Development League, and also the boys' soccer team at Crossroads School in Santa Monica, California. In 2012 Bianchi led his Crossroads team to their first California state championship. He is also the head coach for the Boys' U-11 Santa Monica United club.

References

1983 births
Living people
American soccer players
American soccer coaches
Boston University Terriers men's soccer players
Long Island Rough Riders players
California Victory players
Hollywood United Hitmen players
OC Pateadores Blues players
USL Second Division players
USL First Division players
USL League Two players
Soccer players from California
American people of Italian descent
Association football midfielders
High school soccer coaches in the United States